Maryland Route 501 (MD 501) is a state highway in the U.S. state of Maryland. Known as Chillum Road, the state highway runs  from MD 212 in Chillum east to MD 500 in Mount Rainier. MD 501, which is the main east–west highway through Chillum in northwestern Prince George's County, was constructed in the early 1930s.

Route description

MD 501 begins at an intersection with MD 212 (Riggs Road) in Chillum. Chillum Road continues west as a two-lane undivided county highway toward New Hampshire Avenue just inside the District of Columbia boundary. MD 501 heads southeast as a four-lane undivided highway that intersects Sargent Road and crosses a branch of the Northwest Branch Anacostia River. The highway begins to parallel Northwest Branch and passes under the Green and Yellow lines of the Washington Metro just south of the West Hyattsville station. MD 501 reaches its eastern terminus at MD 500 (Queens Chapel Road) at the city limits of Mount Rainier. Chillum Road continues east into the city as a two-lane undivided street that curves south and becomes 34th Street.

History
MD 501 was paved as a concrete road between 1930 and 1933. The highway was widened with a pair of  bituminous shoulders between 1940 and 1942. A new bridge was built for MD 501 across the branch of Northwest Branch in 1951. This bridge was replaced with one wide enough for the present four-lane road in 1968.

Junction list

See also

References

External links

MDRoads: MD 501

501
Maryland Route 501